Andrew John Mason (born 22 November 1974) in Bolton, England, is an English retired professional footballer who played as a forward for various teams in the Football League.
His older brother Lee is currently a Premier League referee.

Honours

Club
Leigh RMI
Peter Swales Challenge Shield: 1999–2000

References

External links

1974 births
Living people
Footballers from Bolton
English footballers
Association football forwards
Bolton Wanderers F.C. players
Hull City A.F.C. players
Chesterfield F.C. players
Macclesfield Town F.C. players
Boston United F.C. players
Kettering Town F.C. players
Leigh Genesis F.C. players
Leek Town F.C. players
Chorley F.C. players
English Football League players